Trindade and Martim Vaz is an archipelago located in the South Atlantic Ocean about  east of the coast of the Brazilian state of Espírito Santo, of which it forms a part.

The islands are of volcanic origin and have rugged terrain. They are largely barren, except for the southern part of Trindade. They were discovered in 1502 by Portuguese explorer Estêvão da Gama and stayed Portuguese until they became part of Brazil at its independence in 1822. From 1895 to 1896, Trindade was occupied by the United Kingdom until an agreement with Brazil was reached. During the period of British occupation, Trindade was known as South Trinidad.

Due the introduction of invasive species such as sheep, etc. the island's biodiversity has heavily deteriorated since the second half of the 20th century, with many indigenous species becoming endangered.

Geography
The individual islands with their respective locations are given in the following:

Ilha da Trindade (Portuguese for "Trinity Island")
Ilhas de Martim Vaz
The shores are strewn with boulders.
Ilha do Sul is the easternmost point of Brazil.

Trindade 

The small island of Trindade, with an area of 10.3 km², lies at the eastern end of an E-W-trending chain of submarine volcanoes and guyots extending about 1,000 km (620 mi) from the continental shelf off the Brazilian coast. The island lies more than halfway between Brazil and the Mid-Atlantic Ridge near the eastern end of the submarine Vitória-Trindade Ridge.

Trindade is a mountainous, desiccated volcanic island with numerous phonolitic lava domes and steep-sided volcanic plugs. Nearby to the northwest are Pico da Trindade and Pico Bonifácio. The youngest volcanism, at Vulcão do Paredão on the southeast tip of the island, constructed a pyroclastic cone with lava flows that are no older than the Holocene (Almeida, 1961). Remnants of the crater of the  cinder cone are still preserved. Lava flows traveled from the cone to the north, where they formed an irregular shoreline and offshore islands. Smaller volcanic centers of the latest volcanic stage are found in the Morro Vermelho area in the south-central part of the island.

Until 1850, the island was covered 85% of its length by a forest of Colubrina glandulosa trees, 15m in height and 40 cm trunk diameter. The introduction of non-native animals like goats, pigs, sheep, etc. and the indiscriminate cutting of trees led to total extirpation of the same, causing heavy erosion throughout the island with a loss of about 1 to 2 meter of fertile soils. The effect of this devastation impaired the flow of water streams, with the depletion of several springs.

There is a small settlement in the north on the shore of a cove called Enseada dos Portugueses, supporting a garrison of the Brazilian Navy, 32 strong.

The archipelago is the main nesting site of the green sea turtle in Brazil. There are also large numbers of breeding seabirds, including the endemic subspecies of the Great frigatebird (Fregata minor nicolli) and Lesser frigatebird (F. ariel trinitatis), and it is the only Atlantic breeding site for the Trindade petrel. Humpback whales have been confirmed to use the Trindade island as a nursery.

History

16th to 18th century 
The Trindade and Martim Vaz Islands were discovered in 1502 by Portuguese navigators led by Estêvão da Gama, and along with Brazil, became part of the Portuguese Empire.

Many visitors have been to Martim Vaz, the most famous of whom was the English astronomer Edmund Halley, who took possession of the island on behalf of the British Monarchy in 1700. Wild goats and hogs, descendants of ones set free by Halley, were still found on Martim Vaz in 1939.

, a 198-ton, 12-gun cutter-rigged sloop, was wrecked on Trindade on 21 October 1781, shortly after Commander Philippe d'Auvergne had taken over command. Rattlesnake had been ordered to survey the island to ascertain whether it would make a useful base for outward-bound Indiamen. She anchored, but that evening the wind increased and by seven o’clock she was dragging. Two hours later the first cable parted and Commander d’Auvergne club-hauled his way out, setting main and fore sails, and using the remaining anchor cable as a spring. This successfully put Rattlesnake’s head to seaward. The remaining cable was then cut, and the sloop wore round and stood out to sea. However the ground now shallowed quite rapidly and suddenly Rattlesnake struck a submerged rock. She started filling with water, so, in order to preserve the lives of the crew, d'Auvergne ran her ashore. Commodore Johnstone on board  had previously wished to colonise the island and claim it for Britain, so d'Auvergne agreed to stay on the tiny island with 30 sailors, 20 captured French sailors, one French woman, some animals and supplies. They were resupplied by another ship in January 1782, then they appear to have been forgotten, as they lived on the tiny island for a year until  and a convoy of Indiamen, which fortuitously called there, rescued them in late December 1782.

Captain La Pérouse stopped there at the outset of his 1785 voyage to the Pacific.

19th to 20th century 
In 1839, the Ross expedition made a brief stop on Trindade, as chronicled by Robert McCormick. He described Pico Monumento as the "Nine Pin Rock".

In 1889, Edward Frederick Knight went treasure hunting on the island. He was unsuccessful but he wrote a detailed description of the island and his expedition, titled The Cruise of the Alerte.

In 1893 another Franco-American, James Harden-Hickey, claimed the island and declared himself as James I, Prince of Trinidad. According to James Harden-Hickey's plans, Trinidad, after being recognized as an independent country, would become a military dictatorship and have him as dictator. He designed postage stamps, a national flag, and a coat of arms; established a chivalric order, the "Cross of Trinidad"; bought a schooner to transport colonists; appointed M. le Comte de la Boissiere as secretary of state; opened a consular office at 217 West 36th Street in New York City; and even issued government bonds to finance construction of infrastructure on the island. Despite his plans, his idea was ridiculed or ignored by the world.

In July 1895, the British again tried to take possession of this strategic position in the Atlantic. The British planned to use the island as a cable station. However, Brazilian diplomatic efforts, along with Portuguese support, reinstated Trindade Island to Brazilian sovereignty.

In order to clearly demonstrate sovereignty over the island, now part of the State of Espírito Santo and the municipality of Vitória, a landmark was built on 24 January 1897. Nowadays, Brazilian presence is marked by a permanent Brazilian Navy base on the main island.

In July 1910 the ship Terra Nova carrying the last expedition of Captain Robert Falcon Scott to the Antarctic arrived at the island, at the time uninhabited. Some members of the Scott's expedition explored the island with scientific purposes, and a description of it is included in The Worst Journey in the World, by Apsley Cherry-Garrard, one of the members of the expedition.

In August 1914, the Imperial German Navy established a supply base for its warships off Trindade. Carmania sank Cap Trafalgar, but sustained severe damage herself.

21st Century
Trindade was a port passing mark for the 2022 Golden Globe Race, a single-handed round-the-world yacht race.

See also
Trindade hotspot

References

Further reading

External links

 
 
 TRINDADE(Spanish)

Ecoregions of Brazil
Mountains of Brazil
Volcanoes of Brazil
Neotropical tropical and subtropical moist broadleaf forests
Pleistocene stratovolcanoes
Subduction volcanoes
Volcanoes of the Atlantic Ocean
Volcanic plugs of South America
Landforms of Espírito Santo
Archipelagoes of the Atlantic Ocean
Islands of the South Atlantic Ocean
Archipelagoes of Brazil